Opsilia transcaspica is a species of beetle from the family Cerambycidae distributed in Central Asia.

References

Beetles described in 1955
Beetles of Asia
Insects of Central Asia
trancaspica